Adenia pechuelii is a species of plant in the family Passifloraceae. It is endemic to Namibia. Its population is made up of mostly small subpopulations, and most of these are affected by collecting, but it is currently considered to be a species of least concern.

References

pechuelii
Endemic flora of Namibia
Caudiciform plants
Taxonomy articles created by Polbot